Cettire is an Australian-owned, online luxury fashion retail platform selling clothing, shoes and accessories from over 1300 international high-end fashion brands. In 2020 the company listed on the Australian Securities Exchange (ASX), with gross revenue for the 2021 financial year of AUD $124 million.

History 
Founded in 2017 by Dean Mintz, Cettire was created by Ark Technologies, an incubator with a focus on developing technological innovation.

In December 2020, Cettire (CTT) listed on the Australian Securities Exchange (ASX) with a valuation of $190 million. The company raised $65 million at 50c per share via an initial public offering. Within four months, the share price tripled from 50c to a high of $1.94, bringing the company valuation to over $700 million.

See also 

 YOOX Net-a-Porter Group
 Farfetch
 SSENSE
 Mytheresa
 Luxury goods

References 

Online retailers of Australia
Clothing retailers of Australia
Companies listed on the Australian Securities Exchange
2020 initial public offerings